Temitope Ogunjimi is a Canadian rugby sevens player. She won a gold medal at the 2019 Pan American Games as a member of the Canada women's national rugby sevens team. Ogunjimi started her athletic career primarily as a wrestler, winning a gold medal at the 2013 Canada Summer Games as well as the 2014 Junior Pan American Championships. It was not until her third year of university that she took up rugby full-time. She graduated from the University of Calgary with a degree in Law and Society.

References

External links

1995 births
Living people
Canada international rugby sevens players
Female rugby sevens players
Rugby sevens players at the 2019 Pan American Games
Pan American Games gold medalists for Canada
Pan American Games medalists in rugby sevens
University of Calgary alumni
Black Canadian sportspeople
Nigerian emigrants to Canada
Canadian sportspeople of Nigerian descent
Sportspeople from Lagos
Sportspeople from Calgary
Medalists at the 2019 Pan American Games
Canada international women's rugby sevens players